Simplified Universal Player Encoder & Recorder (SUPER) is a closed-source adware front end for open-source software video players and encoders provided by the FFmpeg, MEncoder, MPlayer, x264, ffmpeg2theora, musepack, Monkey's Audio, True Audio, WavPack, libavcodec, and the Theora/Vorbis RealProducer plugIn projects. It was first released in 2005. SUPER provides a graphical user interface to these back-end programs, which use a command-line interface.

Features
SUPER can manipulate and produce many multimedia file formats supported by its back-end programs.

As of 2016, SUPER has a built-in enhanced 3D Video Converter & Recorder engine.

The proposed 3D variations are 3D Anaglyph, Polarized or Shutter side-by-side.

v2017.Build.71+3D+Recorder (April 7, 2017) offers the following encoding modes:
 Normal 2D
 2D >> 3D
 3D >> 2D
 3D >> 3D
Back-end program features supported by SUPER include saving various streaming protocols (mms, rtsp, and http), conversion of Flash Video to other formats, and user-controlled conversion of video between different container formats. Users can choose between various lossless direct audio/video transfers between container formats or lossy video/audio encoding, with encoding possessing the added ability to change video and audio specifications such as bitrate, frame rate, audio channels, resolution, sampling rate, and aspect ratio.
SUPER is also able to utilize its back-end's built-in media players, allowing playback of supported video and audio formats.

Input file format support 

File formats supported by SUPER as input source file for playing and transcoding include:

Video
3GP
ASF
AVI
DAT
Microsoft Digital Video Recording (DVR-MS)
FLIC animation (FLI and FLC)
GXF General Exchange Format
Flash Video (FLV)
MPEG (both MPEG-1 and MPEG-2)
Matroska (MKV)
MPEG-4 Part 14 container (MP4)
MPEG transport stream (TS and M2T and TRP)
OGM Theora/Vorbis
Old PlayStation (STR)
QuickTime movie (MOV and QT)
RealVideo (RM and RMVB)
Shockwave Flash (SWF)
TiVo (TMF and TY and TY+)
VivoActive (VIV)
DVD video files (VOB)
WebM
WTV
Windows Media Video (WMV)

Audio
aac
AC3
ALAC
AMR
FLAC
MP2
MP3
M4A
Monkey's Audio Lossless (APE)
Musepack audio SV7 & SV8(MPC)
Ogg Vorbis
RealAudio (RA)
True Audio Lossless (TTA)
SMAF cell phone audio (MMF)
WMA
WavPack Audio Lossless (WV)
WAV

Other
Avisynth scripts (AVS)
Animated GIF images

System requirements
Operating System: Windows XP, Windows 2003, Windows Vista,  Windows 7,  Windows 8,  Windows 10 or Windows 11.
Administrator privileges (if installed on Administrative account then subsequently converted to a Limited account during the same session, the program will work on the limited)
Processor: Minimum 1.8 GHz Intel Pentium 4 processor or equivalent.
512MB of RAM with 176MB available.
20GB of free space on the Hard disk where the OS is installed
1024 × 768 video resolution or larger
32,000-color video or more
IE 7 or later
Internet connection

SUPER is capable of working on machines with lesser capabilities; the actual minimum system requirements depend on the back-end programs and settings chosen by the program user.

See also
 Comparison of video converters

References

Further reading

 Fernando Cassia (31 July 2006), Don't buy any video converter before trying this freebie, The Inquirer
  Benjamin Blaume (28 June 2008), SUPER: Der kostenlose Alles-Konvertierer, Chip.de
 Doug Sahlin, Chris Botello, YouTube for Dummies, For Dummies, 2007, pp. 183–184
 Rick Broida, How to Do Everything with Your Zune, McGraw-Hill Professional, 2007, pp. 183–185
  Ulrich Bruegmann, Divx R.t.f.m. - Divx 6, Lulu.com, 2006, pp. 273–274
 Sutlej Soin, The Screening Room, Singapore Hardware Mag, May 2008, p. 95

External links

Windows-only freeware
Video conversion software
Windows media players